"All We Know" is a 2016 song by The Chainsmokers.

All We Know may also refer to:

"All We Know" (Paramore song), 2005
"All We Know", a song by Close to Home from Never Back Down

See also
All We Know Is Falling, Paramore studio album
For All We Know (disambiguation)